Zhumaldin Mukhamedovich Karatlyashev (born 11 January 1982) is a former Russian professional football player.

Club career
He played 4 seasons in the Russian Football National League for PFC Spartak Nalchik and FC Chernomorets Novorossiysk.

References

External links
 

1982 births
People from Chegemsky District
Living people
Russian footballers
Association football forwards
PFC Spartak Nalchik players
FC Energiya Volzhsky players
FC Orenburg players
FC Chernomorets Novorossiysk players
Sportspeople from Kabardino-Balkaria